Zubin Potok;  is a town and municipality located in the Mitrovica District in Kosovo. As of 2015, it has an estimated population of 15,200 inhabitants.

Zubin Potok is a part of North Kosovo, a region with an ethnic Serb majority that functions largely autonomously from the remainder of ethnic Albanian-majority Kosovo. After the 2013 Brussels Agreement, the municipality became part of the Community of Serb Municipalities.

Settlements
Aside from the town of Zubin Potok, these villages comprise the municipality of Zubin Potok:

Babiće / Babiq
Banja / Banjë
Brnjak / Bërnjak
Bube / Bubë
Čabra / Çabër
Čečevo / Çeçevë
Češanoviće / Çeshanovë
Crepulja / Crepulë
Čitluk / Çitluk
Donje Varage / Varagë e Ulët
Drajinoviće / Drainovë
Dren
Gornji Jasenovik / Jasenoviku i Epërm
Gornji Strmac / Stramci i Epërm
Jagnjenica
Junake / Junce
Kozarevo / Kozareva
Krligate / Krligatë
Lučka Reka / Lluçkarekë
Međeđi Potok / Prroj i Megjës
Oklace
Rezala / Rezallë
Rujište / Rujishtë
Tušiće / Tushiqë
Velika Kaludra / Kalludra e Madhe
Velji Breg / Bregu i Madh
Vojmisliće / Vojmisliq
Zečeviće / Zeçevicë
Zupče / Zupçë
Padine

Demographics

According to the 2011 estimations by the Government of Kosovo, Zubin Potok has 1,698 households and 6,616 inhabitants. In 2015 report by OSCE, the population of Zubin Potok municipality stands at 15,200 inhabitants.

Ethnic groups
The majority of Zubin Potok municipality is composed of Kosovo Serbs with more than 13,900 inhabitants (91.5%), while 1,300 (8.5%) Kosovo Albanians live in the municipality. Most of Zubin Potok's Kosovo Albanians live in the village of Çabër (Čabra).

The ethnic composition of the municipality of Zubin Potok, including IDPs:

Geography and infrastructure

Location

Economy
Zubin Potok is an agricultural community, yet the level of agricultural production has been in decrease due to the lack of investment. Local factories have been also strongly affected by the lack of consumers in the Albanian parts of Kosovo. Since most factories were established as branches of main Serbian factory chains to serve the Kosovo market, their workers are still employed but work and get paid irregularly. A majority of products sold in the municipality are imported from Serbia.

Twin towns — sister cities
Zubin Potok is twinned with:

 Gradiška, Bosnia and Herzegovina, since 2021

Gallery

See also
 North Kosovo
 Community of Serb Municipalities
 District of Mitrovica

Notes and references
Notes

References

External links 

 Official website 
 IOM Kosovo

 
North Kosovo
Municipalities of Kosovo
Kosovo–Serbia border crossings
Cities in Kosovo